Sheridan Township is a civil township of Calhoun County in the U.S. state of Michigan. It is part of the Battle Creek, Michigan Metropolitan Statistical Area. The population was 1,936 at the 2010 census.

Geography
Sheridan Township is located in eastern Calhoun County and is bordered by Jackson County to the east. The city of Albion is along the southern boundary of the township but administratively separate. Interstate 94 runs through the township with access from two exits.

Demographics

As of the census of 2000, there were 2,116 people, 770 households, and 559 families residing in the township. The racial makeup of the township was 87.81% White, 7.84% African American, 0.61% Native American, 0.24% Asian, 0.99% from other races, and 2.50% from two or more races. Hispanic or Latino of any race were 2.74% of the population.

There were 770 households, out of which 27.4% had children under the age of 18 living with them, 57.0% were married couples living together, 11.0% had a female householder with no husband present, and 27.4% were non-families. 21.4% of all households were made up of individuals, and 9.1% had someone living alone who was 65 years of age or older.  The average household size was 2.50 and the average family size was 2.84.

In the township the population was spread out, with 29.4% under the age of 18, 7.8% from 18 to 24, 24.0% from 25 to 44, 23.1% from 45 to 64, and 15.8% who were 65 years of age or older.  The median age was 36 years. For every 100 females, there were 121.8 males.  For every 100 females age 18 and over, there were 102.9 males.

The median income for a household in the township was $32,075, and the median income for a family was $37,656. Males had a median income of $29,000 versus $25,156 for females. The per capita income for the township was $14,886.  About 7.9% of families and 11.3% of the population were below the poverty line, including 16.0% of those under age 18 and 13.6% of those age 65 or over.

References

External links
Sheridan Township official website

Townships in Calhoun County, Michigan
Superfund sites in Michigan
Townships in Michigan